Real One may refer to:

"Real One" (Chanté Moore song), 2017
RealOne, former name of RealPlayer
Real1, pseudonym of Enzo Amore
The Real One 1998 album by 2 Live Crew
Real Ones, Norwegian rock band